Wetering is a hamlet in the Dutch province of Overijssel. It is located in the municipality of Steenwijkerland, about 9 km southwest of the town of Steenwijk.

It was first mentioned in 1899 as Wetering, and means "discharge canal". Wetering is a statistical entity, has its own postal code, and has two abandoned churches. Nevertheless it is hamlet probably due to its small population and spread out houses.

References

Populated places in Overijssel
Steenwijkerland